City of Life is a 2009 multilingual Emirati film written, directed, and produced by Ali F. Mostafa. Set in the United Arab Emirates, the film revolves around three parallel lives, amongst many cultures in one city, namely, Dubai.

Production

Background 
According to the director Ali F. Mostafa, the inspiration for producing City of Life came from his frustration of people comparing Dubai to a Disneyland. According to the director, "Most of them take one look at the glitzy buildings and assume it’s an artificial place. My film has none of that. It has real people with real problems. Like any other city in the world, my film shows both the positives and the negatives."

Reception

Box office 
According to data produced by Italia Film International the movie ranked second in the local box office and successfully made over 500,000 dirhams in its first weekend.

Cast 
Alexandra Maria Lara as Natalia Moldovan
Sonu Sood as Basu/Peter Patel
Saoud Al Kaabi as Faisal
Narcy as Khalfan
Susan George as Constance Bateman
Jason Flemyng as Guy Berger
Natalie Dormer as Olga
Ahmed Ahmed as Nasser
Habib Ghuloom as Faisal's Father
Jaaved Jaffrey as Suresh Khan
David Chant as Senior Flight Officer

References

External links 
 

2009 films
2000s Arabic-language films
2000s English-language films
2000s Hindi-language films
Films set in Dubai
Films shot in Dubai
2009 drama films
Emirati multilingual films
2009 multilingual films
Films directed by Ali F. Mostafa